Bleach: Dark Souls, known in Japan as  is the second Bleach game for the Nintendo DS. The game introduces new characters, and adds new moves for the older characters as well as introducing new game modes. Bleach: Dark Souls also includes Hollows of varying sizes, for players to fight. The number of Reifu cards in-game are also increased from the original, and more cards (four cards, instead of the previous game's two) are displayed on the touch screen during battle. The Wi-Fi battle mode has been improved to make it easier to play online. The game's theme song is "Resistance" by High and Mighty Color.

Plot
Taking place right after Aizen's defection from the Soul Society, a festival is being held. Ichigo and the others attend before going home. However, some special Mod Souls have been accidentally uncovered by a member of the Department of Research and Development; one of the Mod Souls, Kai, takes the form of the researcher and takes his fellow Mod souls away. However, some of the Mod Souls begin festering with hatred and transform into copies of Hollows, such as Shrieker and Grand Fisher, causing havoc throughout the seireitei.

Reception

Bleach: Dark Souls received "favorable" reviews according to video game review aggregator Metacritic.  In Japan, Famitsu gave it a score of one eight, one seven, one eight, and one seven, for a total of 30 out of 40.

The game was awarded as the Best Fighting Game for the Nintendo DS in IGN's 2008 video game awards.

See also
 List of Nintendo DS games
 List of Nintendo DS Wi-Fi Connection games

References

External links
 Official website

2007 video games
Dark Souls
Nintendo DS games
Nintendo DS-only games
Sega video games
Treasure (company) games
Video game sequels
Multiplayer and single-player video games
Video games developed in Japan